Belltown is a neighborhood of Jurupa Valley, California within the County of Riverside. It was originally known as West Riverside, but their need for a separate identity to the nearby large city of Riverside, they voted to rename their town. It was an unincorporated community, until July 1, 2011, when it became part of the newly incorporated city of Jurupa Valley. It lies at an elevation of 840 feet (256 m). 

Belltown is located on the west bank of the Santa Ana River, across from the city of Riverside. It was founded in 1907 by N.G. Bell.

Government

California is represented in the United States Senate by Democrats Dianne Feinstein and Kamala Harris.

References

Jurupa Valley, California
Populated places on the Santa Ana River
Populated places established in 1907